Huai Rat is a district (amphoe) of Buriram province, northeastern Thailand.

Geography
Neighboring districts are (from the east clockwise) Krasang, Mueang Buriram, Ban Dan and Satuek of Buriram Province.

History
The minor district (king amphoe) Huai Rat was created on 1 April 1990, when the five tambons: Huai Rat, Sam Waeng, Ta Sao, Ban Tako, and Sanuan were split off from Mueang Buriram district. It was upgraded to a full district on 8 September 1995.

Administration
The district is divided into eight districts (tambons), which are further subdivided into 85 villages (mubans). Huai Rat is a township (thesaban tambon) which covers parts of tambon Huai Rat and tambon Huai Racha. There are a further seven tambon administrative organizations (TAO).

References

External links
amphoe.com
 

Huai Rat